Saint-Aubin-des-Bois is a commune in the Calvados department in the Normandy region in northwestern France.

Population

Events
Saint-Aubin-des-Bois hosts an annual event each August, attracting over 5000 visitors, with demonstrations of traditional countryside skills, machinery (farm), vehicles and cars from earliest steam driven to 1960's vehicles. It is held on the third Sunday of August each year.

See also
Communes of the Calvados department

References

Communes of Calvados (department)
Calvados communes articles needing translation from French Wikipedia